Zondervan is a surname. Notable people with the surname include:

Kenrick Zondervan (born 1985), Dutch basketball player
Krina Zondervan, Dutch biomedical scientist
Romeo Zondervan (born 1959), Dutch footballer

Dutch-language surnames